Mababangong Bangungot or Perfumed Nightmare is a 1977 Filipino film starring, written and directed by Kidlat Tahimik, who also edited, co-shot, and produced it. It tells the story of a young Filipino jeepney driver from Barangay Balian, Laguna infatuated the idea of space travel and the West who gradually becomes disillusioned after living in Paris. The film was well received by critics upon release, even earning the International Film Critic's Prize at the Berlin Film Festival.

Plot
Kidlat, a jeepney driver in a village in the Philippines, dreams of becoming an astronaut and making it big in the United States. His dreams take him as far as Europe and to a series of events that will show  him that his idealisation of what Western and European culture has to offer is far from real.

Cast
Kidlat Tahimik as Kidlat

References

External links

1977 films
1977 independent films
American Zoetrope films
Films directed by Kidlat Tahimik
Films set in 1976
Films set in Germany
Films set in Paris
Films set in Laguna (province)
Philippine comedy-drama films
1970s English-language films